The barred honey buzzard or Sulawesi honey buzzard (Pernis celebensis) is a species of bird of prey in the family Accipitridae.

It inhabits subtropical and tropical moist lowland and montane forests of Sulawesi.

References

barred honey buzzard
Endemic birds of Sulawesi
barred honey buzzard
Taxonomy articles created by Polbot